The national flag of Chad is a vertical tricolour consisting (left to right) of a blue, a gold and a red field. Since the 1990s, its similarity to the flag of Romania has caused international discussion. In 2004, Chad asked the United Nations to examine the issue; however, Ion Iliescu, the President of Romania, announced no change would occur to the flag, as the existence of Romania's tricolour predates the existence of Chad as a whole.

Description
The flag of Chad is a vertical tricolour consisting (left to right) of a blue, a gold and a red column. These were intended to be a combination of the colours of blue, white and red as seen on the Flag of France with the Pan-African colours of green, yellow and red. Furthermore, the blue represents the sky and hope; the gold is the sun and desert, and the red signifies the bloodshed over independence.

The flag was adopted in 1960 for the autonomous republic and retained on independence in 1959, and in the constitution of 1962. Despite many political upheavals within Chad since independence, the flag has not been changed. This may be because the flag is not associated with any of the main power rivals within Chad, which had no sense of national identity before independence, and little after independence.

Similarity with Romanian flag 

The flag of Chad is almost identical to the national flag of Romania, although the colours in Chad flags may vary more than those specified for Romania. Romania has used the flag since 1866, which appeared for the first time in its current form in Wallachia. It was officially in use from 1848 until 1948, when it was superseded by the flag of the Socialist Republic of Romania. Chad began to use its present flag in 1960, after it achieved independence from France. When Chad adopted its flag, Romania's flag was different: it used to feature an insignia in the middle of the flag on top of the tricolour; this was added after World War II during the Communist era of the second half of the 20th century. However, in 1989 Romania's Communist government was overthrown and the insignia was removed, reverting Romania's flag to the prewar version which matched the one which had been adopted by Chad in the meantime.

The issue of Romania and Chad sharing similar flags has concerned the Chadian government on occasion; they requested in 2004 that the United Nations should consider it an issue. In response, Romanian President Ion Iliescu said to the media, "The tricolour belongs to us. We will not give up the tricolour."

Colors

Historical flags

See also
 Coat of arms of Chad
 Flag of Romania
 Flag of Moldova
  Flag of Andorra

References

External links

Flags introduced in 1959
Flag
Flags of Africa
Chad